The ceremonial county of Cornwall, which includes the Isles of Scilly, is divided into six parliamentary constituencies. They are all county constituencies.

Parliamentary history of Cornwall
All six parliamentary seats are currently held by Conservatives, having came from holding no seats in 1997, 2001 and 2005, to gaining three of the six from the Liberal Democrats in 2010, to gaining the remaining three to hold all six Cornish seats in 2015. All six MPs were re-elected in 2017. In that election, several previous Liberal Democrat candidates, including previous MPs Andrew George and Steve Gilbert re-stood in their old seats, but failed to be re-elected. In all six seats, the Labour vote surged, pushing the Liberals into third place in four of the six seats. In the 2019 election, Labour retained their position as the second-placed party in most of the Cornish seats, holding their vote up far better in the region than elsewhere in the country. The last Labour MP for a Cornish constituency was Candy Atherton, who held the seat of Falmouth and Camborne between 1997 and 2005.

Constituencies

2010 boundary review 
Under the Fifth Periodic Review of Westminster constituencies, the Boundary Commission for England decided to increase the number of seats which covered Cornwall from 5 to 6. Falmouth and Camborne, and Truro and St Austell were abolished and replaced by Camborne and Redruth, St Austell and Newquay, and Truro and Falmouth.

Proposed boundary changes 
See 2023 Periodic Review of Westminster constituencies for further details.

Following the abandonment of the Sixth Periodic Review (the 2018 review), the Boundary Commission for England formally launched the 2023 Review on 5 January 2021. Initial proposals were published on 8 June 2021 and, following two periods of public consultation, revised proposals were published on 8 November 2022. Final proposals will be published by 1 July 2023.

The commission has proposed retaining the current constituencies in Cornwall, with minor boundary changes to reflect changes to electoral divisions within the county and to bring the electorates within the statutory range.

Results history
Primary data source: House of Commons research briefing - General election results from 1918 to 2019

Vote breakdown

Percentage votes 

1Includes Constitutionalist in 1924 and National Liberal Party up to 1966

21950-1979 - Liberal; 1983 & 1987 - SDP-Liberal Alliance

* Included in Other

Meaningful vote percentages are not applicable for the elections of 1918, 1922, 1931 and 1935 since one or more seats were gained unopposed.

Seats 

1Includes Constitutionalist in 1924 and National Liberal Party up to 1966

2pre-1979 - Liberal; 1983 & 1987 - SDP-Liberal Alliance

Maps

Historical representation by party 
A cell marked → (with a different colour background to the preceding cell) indicates that the previous MP continued to sit under a new party name.

1832 to 1868 (14 MPs)

1868 to 1885 (13 MPs)

1885 to 1918 (7 MPs)

1918 to 1950 (5 MPs)

1950 to 2010 (5 MPs)

2010 to present (6 MPs)

See also

 List of constituencies in South West England

Notes

References

 
Cornwall
 Cornwall
Parliamentary